Plant functional types (PFTs) is a system used by climatologists to classify plants according to their physical,  phylogenetic and phenological characteristics as part of an overall effort to develop a vegetation model for use in land use studies and climate models.  PFTs provide a finer level of modeling than biomes, which represent gross areas such as desert, savannah, deciduous forest.  In creating a PFT model, areas as small as 1 km2 are modeled by defining the predominant plant type for that area, interpreted from satellite data or other means.  For each plant functional type, a number of key parameters are defined, such as fecundity, competitiveness, resorption (rate at which plant decays and returns nutrients to the soil after death), etc.; the value of each parameter is determined or inferred from observable characteristics such as plant height, leaf area, etc.

Climatologists and ecologists struggle to determine which minimal set of plant characteristics best model the actual responses of the biosphere in response to climate changes.

See also

 Ecotone

References

Plant taxonomy